The following is a list of the major island groups of North America.

Arctic Ocean
Islands of the western Arctic Ocean:
Canadian Arctic Archipelago
Baffin Island, largest island of Canada and the world's 5th largest island
Victoria Island, world's 8th largest island
Banks Island, world's 24th largest island
Southampton Island, world's 34th largest island
Prince of Wales Island, world's 40th largest island
Somerset Island, world's 46th largest island
King William Island, world's 61st largest island
Bylot Island, world's 72nd largest island
Prince Charles Island, world's 78th largest island
Queen Elizabeth Islands
Alexander Island
Baillie-Hamilton Island
Borden Island, world's 171st largest island
Ellesmere Island, world's 10th largest island and 37th tallest island
Ward Hunt Island
Cornwall Island, world's 186th largest island 
Eglinton Island, world's 249th largest island
Graham Island, world's 268th largest island
Lougheed Island, world's 275th largest island
Byam Martin Island, world's 298th largest island
Île Vanier, world's 302nd largest island
Cameron Island, world's 314th largest island
Brock Island
North Kent Island
Emerald Isle
Massey Island
Little Cornwallis Island
Coburg Island
Helena Island
Griffith Island
Hoved Island
Lowther Island
Buckingham Island
Beechey Island
Seymour Island
Browne Island
Cocked Hat Island
Crescent Island
Des Voeux Island
Dundas Island
Edmund Walker Island
Eight Bears Island
Ekins Island
Exmouth Island
Fairholme Island
Fitzwilliam Owen Island
Garrett Island
Grosvenor Island
Houston Stewart Island
Hyde Parker Island
Île Marc
John Barrow Island
Margaret Island
Nookap Island
Norman Lockyer Island
Patterson Island
Philpots Island
Pim Island
Pioneer Island
Princess Royal Island
Skraeling Island
Spit Island (Kate Island)
Stupart Island
Table Island
Thor Island
Truro Island
Devon Island, world's largest uninhabited landmass and 27th largest island
Melville Island, world's 33rd largest island
Bathurst Island, world's 54th largest island
Prince Patrick Island, world's 55th largest island
Cornwallis Island, world's 96th largest island
Mackenzie King Island, world's 115th largest island
Moore Island
Sverdrup Islands
Axel Heiberg Island, world's 32nd largest island
Ellef Ringnes Island, world's 69th largest island
Amund Ringnes Island, world's 111th largest island
King Christian Island
Meighen Island
Stor Island
Haig-Thomas Island
Hat Island
Ulvingen Island
Islands of Hudson Bay
Coats Island, world's 107th largest island
Belcher Islands
Bradbury Island
Broomfield Island
Bun Island
Cake Island
Camsell Island
Dove Island
Fair Island
Flaherty Island
Innetalling Island
Karlay Island
La Duke Island
Johnnys Island
Mata Island
Nero Island
Loaf Island
Mavor Island
Moore Island
Ney Island
Kugong Island
O'Leary Island
Range Island
Renouf Island
Snape Island
Split Island
Tukarak Island
Twin Cairns Island
Walton Island
Wiegand Island
Islands of James Bay
Akimiski Island, world's 162nd largest island
Big Island
Carey Island (Cary Island)
Charlton Island
Grey Goose Island
Gull Island
Jacob Island (Wood Island)
Moore Island
North Twin Island
South Twin Island
Spencer Island
Stag Island
Sunday Island
Trodely Island (Trodley Island)
Walter Island
Weston Island

Greenland
Greenland, world's largest and 11th tallest island
Qeqertarsuaq (Disko Island), world's 85th largest island
Milne Land
Traill Island
Ymer Island
Geographical Society Island
Clavering Island
Nares Land
Shannon Island
The following islands are usually associated with Europe rather than North America, despite lying closer to Greenland than to Scandinavia:
Iceland, world's 18th largest island
Jan Mayen
Svalbard Archipelago
Spitsbergen, world's 35th largest island
Nordaustlandet, world's 58th largest island
Edgeoya
Barentsoya

North Atlantic Ocean
Islands of the western North Atlantic Ocean:
Bermuda Islands
Bermuda
Atlantic Coastal Islands
Florida Keys
Key West
Key Largo
Merritt Island
Sea Islands
Hilton Head Island
Port Royal Island
Johns Island
Saint Helena Island
Edisto Island
Cayman Islands
Outer Banks
Staten Island
Manhattan Island, most densely populated island of the Americas
Long Island, largest Atlantic island of the United States, most populous island of the United States, and the world's 17th most populous island
New York Barrier Islands
Block Island
Conanicut Island
Aquidneck Island (Rhode Island)
Elizabeth Islands
Martha's Vineyard
Nantucket Island
Monomoy Island
Boston Harbor Islands
Mount Desert Island, largest island of Maine
Cape Breton Island, world's 77th largest island
Prince Edward Island, world's 104th largest island
Anticosti Island, world's 90th largest island
Newfoundland, largest Atlantic island of Canada and the world's 16th largest island
Ile de Saint-Pierre
Ile de Miquelon, largest island of Saint Pierre and Miquelon

North Pacific Ocean
Islands of the eastern North Pacific Ocean:
Islands of the Bering Sea
Pribilof Islands
Saint Paul Island
St. George Island
Otter Island
Walrus Island
Saint Lawrence Island, world's 113th largest island
Diomede Islands
Big Diomede Island
Little Diomede Island
King Island
Saint Matthew Island
Karaginsky Island
Aleutian Islands
Fox Islands
Unimak Island, world's 134th largest island, world's 28th tallest island
Umnak Island, world's 223rd largest island
Unalaska Island, world's 174th largest island
Amaknak Island (Umaknak Island)
Akutan Island
Akun Island
Sanak Island
Islands of Four Mountains
Amukta Island
Chagulak Island
Yunaska Island
Herbert Island
Carlisle Island
Chuginadak Island
Uliaga Island
Kagamil Island
Andreanof Islands
Tanaga Island
Kanaga Island
Adak Island
Kagalaska Island
Great Sitkin Island
Little Tanaga Island
Atka Island, world's 313rd largest island
Amlia Island
Seguam Island
Delarof Islands
Gareloi Island
Amatignak Island
Ilak Island
Kavalga Island
Ogliuga Island
Skagul Island
Tanadak Island
Ugidak Island
Ulak Island
Unalga Island
Rat Islands
Kiska Island
Little Kiska Island
Segula Island
Buldir Island
Near Islands
Commander Islands
Kodiak Archipelago
Kodiak Island, largest island of Alaska and the world's 80th largest island
Islands of the Gulf of Alaska
Montague Island
Alexander Archipelago
ABC Islands
Admiralty Island
Baranof Island
Chichagof Island, world's 109th largest island
Dall Island
Kupreanof Island
Prince of Wales Island, world's 97th largest island
Revillagigedo Island
Wrangell Island
Haida Gwaii
Graham Island, world's 101st largest island
Moresby Island
Vancouver Island, largest Pacific island of Canada and the world's 43rd largest island
San Juan Archipelago
Gulf Islands
San Juan Islands
Orcas Island, second largest island of Washington
Whidbey Island
Channel Islands of California
Santa Cruz Island, largest island of California
Isla de Cedros
Islands of the Gulf of California
Isla Ángel de la Guarda
Tiburón Island, largest island of Mexico
Guadalupe Island
Revillagigedo Islands
Isla Socorro
Islas Marías
Clipperton Island
Isla Espiritu Santo, largest island of El Salvador
Isla del Coco, largest island of Costa Rica
Isla de Coiba, largest island of Panama
Pearl Islands
Isla del Rey

Hawaii
Hawaii Islands
Northwestern Hawaiian Islands

Inland islands
Lake islands of North America:
Atlin Lake,
Theresa Island, highest elevation inside a freshwater lake in North America at 2059m
Lake Huron
Manitoulin Island, world's largest inland island
Saint Joseph Island, world's 8th largest inland island
Drummond Island, world's 9th largest inland island
Thirty Thousand Islands
Lake Superior
Isle Royale, world's 6th largest inland island
Saint Ignace Island, world's 12th largest inland island
Michipicoten Island, world's 19th largest inland island
Madeline Island
Lake Erie
Mohawk Island
Lake Ontario
Thousand Islands
Lake Washington
Mercer Island
Lake Nicaragua
Ometepe, 11th largest inland island
Isla Zapatera
Solentiname Islands
Great Slave Lake
Simpson Islands
Big Simpson Island, world's 13th largest inland island
Blanchet Island, world's 14th largest inland island
Preble Island, world's 20th largest inland island
Manicouagan Reservoir
René-Levasseur Island, world's largest artificial island and 2nd largest inland island
Grand Lake on the Island of Newfoundland
Glover Island, world's 18th largest inland island
River islands of North America:
Saint Lawrence River
Île de Montréal, most populous island of Canada
Niagara River
Grand Island
Navy Island
Goat Island
Dufferin Islands
Hudson River
Schodack Island
Westerlo (Castle) Island
Susquehanna River
McCormick Island
Wade Island

See also

Clipperton Island
List of islands by area
List of islands by highest point
List of islands by population
List of islands in lakes
List of islands of Central America
List of islands of South America
List of the highest islands of North America
Navassa Island
Outline of North America

References

External links

Island Directory @ United Nations Environment Programme

World island information @ WorldIslandInfo.com

 
Islands
North America